Field magazine (stylized as FIELD) is a twice-yearly literary magazine published by Oberlin College Press in Oberlin, Ohio, and focusing on contemporary poetry and poetics.
 
Field has published spring and fall issues each year since its founding in 1969. Contributors have included Adrienne Rich, Charles Wright, Thomas Lux, and Franz Wright.

References

External links
 

Poetry magazines published in the United States
Biannual magazines published in the United States
Magazines established in 1969
Magazines published in Ohio
Oberlin College
1969 establishments in Ohio
Academic journals published by university presses of the United States